Mount Kelly is a prominent peak, (1,110 m), located 3 nautical miles (6 km) northwest of Mount Burch in the western portion of the Anare Mountains, a major mountain range situated in Victoria Land, Antarctica. The topographical feature was so named by ANARE (Australian National Antarctic Research Expeditions) for Second Lieutenant R.M. Kelly, officer in charge of the army amphibious motor vehicle detachment with ANARE (Thala Dan) 1962, led by Phillip Law, which explored the area. The mountain lies situated on the Pennell Coast, a portion of Antarctica lying between Cape Williams and Cape Adare.

References

Kelly
Pennell Coast